In classical mechanics, a Liouville dynamical system is an exactly solvable  dynamical system in which the kinetic energy T and potential energy V can be expressed in terms of the s generalized coordinates q as follows:

The solution of this system consists of a set of separably integrable equations

As described below, the variables have been changed from qs to φs, and the functions us and ws substituted by their counterparts χs and ωs. This solution has numerous applications, such as the orbit of a small planet about two fixed stars under the influence of Newtonian gravity. The Liouville dynamical system is one of several things named after Joseph Liouville, an eminent French mathematician.

Example of bicentric orbits

In classical mechanics, Euler's three-body problem describes the motion of a particle in a plane under the influence of two fixed centers, each of which attract the particle with an inverse-square force such as Newtonian gravity or Coulomb's law.  Examples of the bicenter problem include a planet moving around two slowly moving stars, or an electron moving in the electric field of two positively charged nuclei, such as the first ion of the hydrogen molecule H2, namely the hydrogen molecular ion or H2+.  The strength of the two attractions need not be equal; thus, the two stars may have different masses or the nuclei two different charges.

Solution

Let the fixed centers of attraction be located along the x-axis at ±a.   The potential energy of the moving particle is given by

The two centers of attraction can be considered as the foci of a set of ellipses.  If either center were absent, the particle would move on one of these ellipses, as a solution of the Kepler problem.  Therefore, according to Bonnet's theorem, the same ellipses are the solutions for the bicenter problem.

Introducing elliptic coordinates,

the potential energy can be written as

and the kinetic energy as

This is a Liouville dynamical system if ξ and η are taken as φ1 and φ2, respectively; thus, the function Y equals

and the function W equals

Using the general solution for a Liouville dynamical system below, one obtains

Introducing a parameter u by the formula

gives the parametric solution

Since these are elliptic integrals, the coordinates ξ and η can be expressed as elliptic functions of u.

Constant of motion

The bicentric problem has a constant of motion, namely,

from which the problem can be solved using the method of the last multiplier.

Derivation

New variables

To eliminate the v functions, the variables are changed to an equivalent set

giving the relation

which defines a new variable F.   Using the new variables, the u and w functions can be expressed by equivalent functions χ and ω.  Denoting the sum of the χ functions by Y,

the kinetic energy can be written as

Similarly, denoting the sum of the ω functions by W

the potential energy V can be written as

Lagrange equation

The Lagrange equation for the rth variable  is

which may be written as

where E = T + V is the (conserved) total energy.  It follows that

which may be integrated once to yield

Inverting, taking the square root and separating the variables yields a set of separably integrable equations:

References

Further reading

 

Classical mechanics